The Army Medical Service (Hærens sanitet) was a branch of the Norwegian Armed Forces. Dating back to the 19th century, it was dissolved in 2002 when all medical services became part of the Norwegian Armed Forces Medical Services (Forsvarets sanitet).

Heads
Ole Svennby (1932–1940)
Johan Holst (1940–1945)
Carl Semb (1945–present)
Torstein Dale

References

Norwegian Army
Army medical administrative corps
Military units and formations disestablished in 2002